The Enchanted Highway is a collection of the world's largest scrap metal sculptures  constructed at intervals along a  stretch of two-lane highway in the southwestern part of the U.S. state of North Dakota.

Description
The Enchanted Highway extends north from Regent to the Gladstone exit on Interstate 94 east of Dickinson. Each sculpture has a developed pull-out and several have picnic shelters; the highway passes through scenic farm country with intermittent buttes. Geese in Flight is visible from I-94, standing 110 feet tall and 150 feet wide. In 2002, it was recognized as the world's largest scrap metal sculpture by the Guinness Book of World Records.

History
Local artist Gary Greff conceived of the project and began building it in 1989, and continues to maintain the sculptures. He took inspiration from local wildlife and historical figures, including Theodore Roosevelt. Greff's intention was to revive his hometown of Regent, after decades of population and economy decline. In 2012, Greff opened a motel, The Enchanted Castle, in Regent, continuing the theme of the Enchanted Highway. The State of North Dakota provided $75,000 in its 2019-2020 budget to assist Greff in maintaining the sculptures; prior to that year, he had used his own money and donations to pay for upkeep. The highway attracts approximately 6,000 tourist cars per year.

Sculptures
The Tin Family (1991)
Teddy Rides Again (1993)
Pheasants on the Prairie (1996)
Grasshoppers in the Field (1999)
Geese in Flight (2001)
Deer Crossing (2002)
Fisherman's Dream (2006)
Spider Webs (In progress)

Gallery

References

External links

 Regent and the Enchanted Highway area placemarks for Google Earth.
 Zoomable pictures of each site
 Regent, North Dakota, and the Enchanted Highway, a Photo Gallery by J. Q. Jacobs.
 Hettinger County Historical Society Museums, Regent, North Dakota.
 North Dakota Tourism website
 National Geographic Top 10 U.S. Roadside Attractions
 The Enchanted Highway at Dakota Search

Outdoor sculptures in North Dakota
Buildings and structures in Hettinger County, North Dakota
Tourist attractions in Hettinger County, North Dakota
Roadside attractions in North Dakota
Sculpture series